Il Giustino is an opera in three acts by composer Giovanni Legrenzi. The work uses an Italian language libretto by Nicolò Beregan based on the life of Emperor Justin I. The opera premiered on 7 February 1683 at the Teatro San Salvador in Venice.

Background and performance history
Considered one of Legrenzi's finest compositions, the work includes more than 70 arias. The opera tells the story of Giustino's rise from the position of a simple poor farmer to being crowned the Byzantine Emperor. For several decades following its 1683 premiere at the Teatro San Salvador, Il Giustino was one of the most widely performed Venetian operas. According to musicologist Reinhard Strohm, its music was still being discussed as late as 1720 in Marcello's Il teatro alla moda.<ref>Strohm, Reinhard (2005). [https://books.google.com/books?id=otx2HYx3fqcC&pg=PA132 "Vivaldi and Handel's Settings of Giustino"], pp. 132–133. Music and Theatre: Essays in Honour of Winton Dean. Cambridge University Press. </ref>

On 26 April 2007, Il Giustino'' had its first modern revival at the Schwetzingen Festival in a production directed by Nicolas Brieger with set designer Katrin Nettrod and costume designer Jorge Jara. Musicologist and conductor Thomas Hengelbrock prepared the performance score for the production, and also led the Balthasar-Neumann-Ensemble in performances of the work. Soprano Elisabeth Kulman led the cast in the title role of Giustino, with Georg Nigl as Ariannas, Cornelia Ptassek as Arianna, Terry Wey as Andronico/Flavia, Delphine Galou as Eufemia, Peter Kennel as Vitaliano, and Hermann Oswald as Amantio.

Roles

References

Operas
1683 operas
Italian-language operas
Operas by Giovanni Legrenzi